Lamkansa is a neighbourhood in Casablanca, Morocco. According to the 2004 census it had a population of 33,940. In 2014, the population increase to 103 026 persons.

References

Neighbourhoods of Casablanca